{{New Testament manuscript infobox
| form   = Papyrus
| number =𝔓24
| image  = 
| isize  = 
| caption= 
| name   = P. Oxy. 1230
| sign   = 
| text   = Revelation 5-6 †
| script = Greek
| date   = 4th century
| found  = Egypt
| now at = Franklin Trask Library Andover Newton Theological School
| cite   = B. P. Grenfell & A. S. Hunt, Oxyrynchus Papyri X, (London 1914), pp. 18-19
| size   = [19 by 28 cm]
| type   = Alexandrian text-type
| cat    = I
| hand   = 
| note   = 
}}Papyrus 24 (in the Gregory-Aland numbering), designated by siglum 𝔓24', is an early copy of the New Testament in Greek. It is a papyrus manuscript of the Book of Revelation, it contains only Revelation 5:5-8; 6:5-8. The manuscript paleographically has been assigned to the early 4th century.

 Description 
Originally it was written on a large leaf (approximately 19 by 28 cm).
It is the earliest manuscript which has survived to the present day with the text of Rev. 5–6. It uses letter Ζ for επτα (seven'').

The Greek text of this codex is a representative of the Alexandrian text-type (rather proto-Alexandrian). Aland placed it in Category I. This manuscript exhibits textual agreement with Papyrus 18, Papyrus 47, and Codex Sinaiticus, but the surviving fragment is too small to determine its overall textual affinities.

It is currently housed at the Franklin Trask Library Andover Newton Theological School (OP 1230) in Newton, Massachusetts.

See also 

 List of New Testament papyri
Revelation 5, 6

References

Further reading 

 B. P. Grenfell & A. S. Hunt, Oxyrynchus Papyri X, (London 1914), pp. 18–19.

External links 

 Robert B. Waltz. NT Manuscripts: Papyri, 𝔓24.' Encyclopedia of Textual Criticism
 P24 images at the Center for the Study of New Testament Manuscripts

New Testament papyri
4th-century biblical manuscripts
Book of Revelation papyri